Joseph Corsi (fourth ¼ 1894 – first ¼ 1959) was a Welsh professional rugby league footballer who played in the 1920s.

Background
Joe Corsi's birth was registered in Cardiff district, Wales, and his death aged 64 was registered in Cardiff district, Wales.

Playing career

International honours
Joe Corsi played , i.e. number 5, in Wales' 11-18 defeat by England at Fartown Ground, Huddersfield on Thursday 1 November 1923.

Challenge Cup Final appearances
Joe Corsi played , i.e. number 5, in Rochdale Hornets' 10-9 victory over Hull F.C. in the 1922 Challenge Cup Final during the 1921–22 season at Headingley Rugby Stadium, Leeds on Saturday 6 May 1922, in front of a crowd of 32,596, and played  in Oldham's 4–21 defeat by Wigan in the 1924 Challenge Cup Final during the 1923–24 season at Athletic Grounds, Rochdale on Saturday 12 April 1924. About Joe Corsi's time, there was Oldham's 16–3 victory over Hull Kingston Rovers in the 1925 Challenge Cup Final during the 1924–25 season at Headingley Rugby Stadium, Leeds, the 3–9 defeat by Swinton in the 1926 Challenge Cup Final during the 1925–26 season at Athletic Grounds, Rochdale, and the 26–7 victory over Swinton in the 1927 Challenge Cup Final during the 1926–27 season at Central Park, Wigan.

County Cup Final appearances
Joe Corsi played , i.e. number 5, in Oldham's 10–0 victory over St Helens Recs in the 1924 Lancashire County Cup Final during the 1924–25 season at The Willows, Salford on Saturday 22 November 1924.

Genealogical information
Joe Corsi's marriage to Winifred M. (née Palmer) was registered during second ¼ 1913 in Cardiff district. They had children; Josephine Corsi (birth registered) second ¼ 1914 in Cardiff district, Gladys L. Corsi (birth registered) second ¼ 1916 in Cardiff district.

References

External links
Statistics at orl-heritagetrust.org.uk 

1894 births
1959 deaths
Oldham R.L.F.C. players
Rochdale Hornets players
Rugby league wingers
Rugby league players from Cardiff
Wales national rugby league team players
Welsh rugby league players